Plastic arts  are art forms which involve physical manipulation of a plastic medium by molding or modeling such as sculpture or ceramics.  Less often the term may be used broadly for all the visual arts (such as painting, sculpture, film and photography), as opposed to literature and music.  Materials for use in the plastic arts, in the narrower definition, include those that can be carved or shaped, such as stone or wood, concrete, glass, or metal.

The term "plastic" has been used to mean certain synthetic organic resins ever since they were invented, but the term "plastic arts" long preceded them.  The term should not be confused, either, with Piet Mondrian's concept of "Neoplasticism".

History
The oldest known plastic arts date to (30,000–34,000 BP).

Philosophy
In contrast to the limiting of 'plastic arts' to sculpture and architecture by Friedrich Wilhelm Joseph Schelling in 1807, the German critic August Wilhelm Schlegel (1767-1845) applied the concept not only to visual arts, but also poetry.

Classical poetry lines he saw utilizing plastic isolation, and rhyme falling under the Romantic (domain).

In Schlegel's Viennese lectures (1809-1811), published in 1827 as On the Theory and History of the Plastic Arts, he contrasted the plasticism of Classical Art with picturesque Romanticism. He   These distinctions were carried over into Russian Romanticism aesthetics,

Gallery

See also

 Art materials
 Handicraft
 Media (arts)
 Plastic in art
 Visual arts
 Plastic number 
 Recording medium

References

Further reading
 Barnes, A. C., The Art in Painting, 3rd ed., 1937, Harcourt, Brace & World, Inc., NY.  
 Bukumirovic, D. (1998). Maga Magazinovic. Biblioteka Fatalne srpkinje knj. br. 4. Beograd: Narodna knj.
 Fazenda, M. J. (1997). Between the pictorial and the expression of ideas: the plastic arts and literature in the dance of Paula Massano. N.p.
 Gerón, C. (2000). Enciclopedia de las artes plásticas dominicanas: 1844–2000. 4th ed. Dominican Republic s.n.
 Schlegel, August Wilhelm., (1966) Vorlesungen uber dramatische Kunst und Literatur, Stuttgart: Kohlhammer Verlag, 1966, p. 21f.